Coney Island is an unincorporated community in Laketown Township, Carver County, Minnesota, United States.  The community is located along Highway 5 at Laketown Parkway near Waconia and St. Bonifacius.

Coney Island took its name from a nearby lake island, which was a popular summer resort.

References

Unincorporated communities in Carver County, Minnesota
Unincorporated communities in Minnesota